Borçka Dam is a dam on the Çoruh River   south east of Borçka in Artvin Province, Turkey. It was built between 1999 and 2006.

See also

Muratlı Dam – downstream
Deriner Dam – upstream
List of dams and reservoirs in Turkey

References

Dams in Artvin Province
Hydroelectric power stations in Turkey
Dams on the Çoruh River
Dams completed in 2006